Munditia anomala is a minute sea snail, a marine gastropod mollusc in the family Liotiidae.

Description
The height of the shell attains 0.45 mm, its diameter 1 mm.

Distribution
It occurs at Tom Bowling Bay, North Island, New Zealand.

References

 Powell A. W. B., New Zealand Mollusca, William Collins Publishers Ltd, Auckland, New Zealand 1979

External links
  Munditia anomala; Transactions and Proceedings of the Royal Society of New Zealand 1868-1961; Volume 70, 1940-41

anomala
Gastropods of New Zealand
Gastropods described in 1940